Jennifer Duncalf (born 10 November 1982) is a former professional squash player from England. She reached a career-high world ranking of World No. 2 in December 2009.

Career
Duncalf was born in Haarlem, Netherlands but was a pupil at Harrogate Grammar School where she attended from 1994-2001. As a junior player, she won the European Junior Championship title. Duncalf won the European Individual Championship title in 2006 and 2007, and the British National Championship title in 2007 and 2009.

She was also a member of the England team which won the World Team Squash Championships in 2006. In 2008, she finished runner-up at the British Open (losing in the final to Nicol David). Duncalf ends the year 2009 on a high when she won three titles in a row—the Soho Square Open, the US Open and the prestigious Qatar Classic.

In October 2010, in the women's singles final of the 2010 Commonwealth Games in Delhi, Duncalf was defeated by Nicol David 11–3, 11–5, 11–7 in 40 minutes to settle for the silver medal. Soon after, she was part of the English team that won the silver medal at the 2010 Women's World Team Squash Championships.

In 2012, she was part of the England team that won the silver medal at the 2012 Women's World Team Squash Championships.

She announced her retirement at the end of the 2019 season after gaining 133 caps for England.

Personal life
Duncalf is openly lesbian and is in a same-sex relationship with fellow former No. 1 squash player Rachael Grinham.

World Open

Finals: 1 (0 title, 1 runner-up)

Major World Series final appearances

British Open: 1 finals (0 title, 1 runner-up)

Hong Kong Open: 1 final (0 title, 1 runner-up)

Qatar Classic: 1 final (1 title, 0 runner-up)

Malaysian Open: 2 finals (0 title, 2 runner-up)

See also
 Official Women's Squash World Ranking

References

External links 

English female squash players
1982 births
Living people
Sportspeople from Haarlem
Squash players at the 2010 Commonwealth Games
Commonwealth Games silver medallists for England
Commonwealth Games medallists in squash
LGBT squash players
Lesbian sportswomen
English LGBT sportspeople
People educated at Harrogate Grammar School
Sportspeople from Harrogate
Medallists at the 2010 Commonwealth Games